The 2023 Nigerian presidential election in Jigawa State will be held on 25 February 2023 as part of the nationwide 2023 Nigerian presidential election to elect the president and vice president of Nigeria. Other federal elections, including elections to the House of Representatives and the Senate, will also be held on the same date while state elections will be held two weeks afterward on 11 March.

Background
Jigawa State is a northwestern state mainly inhabited by ethnic Hausas and Fulanis. It has a growing economy but is facing an underdeveloped agricultural sector, desertification, and low education rates. Politically, the 2019 elections confirmed the state's status as one of the most staunchly APC states in the nation as both Buhari and APC Governor Mohammed Badaru Abubakar won the state by wide margins and every single legislative seat on the senatorial, House of Representatives, and House of Assembly levels were carried by APC nominees.

Polling

Projections

General election

Results

By senatorial district 
The results of the election by senatorial district.

By federal constituency
The results of the election by federal constituency.

By local government area 
The results of the election by local government area.

See also 
 2023 Jigawa State elections
 2023 Nigerian presidential election

Notes

References 

Jigawa State gubernatorial election
2023 Jigawa State elections
Jigawa